The Jaguar AJ-8 is a compact DOHC V8 piston engine used in many Jaguar vehicles. It was the fourth new engine type in the history of the company. It was an in house design with work beginning before Ford's purchase of the company. 
In 1997 it replaced both designs previously available on Jaguar cars: the straight-6 Jaguar AJ6 engine (or rather its AJ16 variant), and the Jaguar V12 engine. It remained the only engine type available on Jaguar until 1999 with the launch of the S-Type, when the Jaguar AJ-V6 engine was added to the list. The AJ-V8 is available in displacements ranging from 3.2L to 5.0L, and a supercharged version is also produced. Ford Motor Company also used this engine in other cars, including the Lincoln LS and the 2002-2005 Ford Thunderbird, as well as in several Land Rovers, and the Aston Martin V8 Vantage.

The AJ-V8 was designed to use Nikasil-coated cylinders rather than the more-common iron cylinder liners. However, like the BMW M60, high-sulphur fuel reacted with the Nikasil coating and caused engine failures. Jaguar replaced affected engines, and has used conventional cast-iron linings ever since.

The engine originally used a two-state Variable Valve Timing system to switch the intake cam timing by 30°. Newer variants use a more sophisticated system which can vary intake timing incrementally up to 48°. The Lincoln version was made in the United States.

Other engine features include fracture-split forged powder metal connecting rods, a special one-piece cast camshaft, and reinforced plastic intake manifold.

The AJ-V8 was on the Ward's 10 Best Engines list for 2000.

Ford ceased production of the AJ-V8 engine in September 2020 when it closed the Bridgend Plant.  However, in August 2020 JLR was able to take over production means for the AJ-V8.

Manufacture
The AJ8 engine is manufactured in an all-new, dedicated Jaguar facility located within the Ford Bridgend Engine Plant in Bridgend, South Wales. The Jaguar "plant-within-a-plant" saved considerable investment costs by Jaguar. It is staffed by workers dedicated to Jaguar engine production and includes a linked flow-line of computer numerically controlled machines with automated loading and assembly. Component supply is on a "just-in-time" basis.

4.0 L  

The  AJ26 engine was introduced in 1996. The number "26" comes from 12+6+8 (cylinders), because when the first ideas were sketched, a family of 6-, 8- and 12-cylinder engines was contemplated, although only the 8-cylinder version was produced. 
It has a square  bore and stroke. It was updated in 1998 as the AJ27 with continuously variable valve timing. The AJ-V8 was updated again in 2000 as the AJ28. The naturally aspirated version produces   in the 2000-2002 XK8.

Vehicles using this engine:

 AJ26
 1997-1998 Jaguar XJ8
 1997-1998 Jaguar XK8
 1997-1998 Daimler V8
 AJ27
 1999-2003 Jaguar XJ8
 1999-2003 Jaguar XK8
 1999-2003 Daimler V8
 AJ28
 2000-2002 Jaguar S-Type ,

Supercharged  

The supercharged version of the AJ26 is used in the high-performance R versions of Jaguar's cars. The engine was updated with AJ27 specifications for 2000. The supercharged engine did not use variable cam timing as the normal benefits of improved volumetric efficiency are not noticeable on a boosted engine.

Vehicles using the supercharged version include:
 AJ26S
 1998-1999 Jaguar XJR
 1998-1999 Jaguar XKR
 1998-1999 Daimler Super V8
 AJ27S
 2000-2003 Jaguar XJR
 2000-2003 Jaguar XKR
 2000-2003 Daimler Super V8

3.2 L 

The 3.2 litre variant was the second to be introduced. This variant was not available in the North American market.

Vehicles using this engine:
 1997-2003 Jaguar XJ8

3.5 L 

The , marketed as "3.5", was used in the XJ series as well.

Vehicles using this engine:
 2002–2007 Jaguar XJ8 3.5,  and

3.9 L  

The  AJ30/AJ35 variant is a unique displacement used only by Ford and Lincoln and is built in Ford's Lima, OH engine plant. The AJ35 version introduced for the 2003 model year added variable valve timing of the intake camshafts and electronic throttle control. While the block, crankshaft, pistons, and connecting rods are all unique to this displacement, many other parts are shared with the AJ-V8 engines produced in the UK by Jaguar.

Vehicles using this engine:
 2000-2002 Lincoln LS,  
 2002 Ford Thunderbird,  
 2003-2006 Lincoln LS,  
 2003-2005 Ford Thunderbird,  
 Ford Forty-Nine concept

The last AJ35 was produced in March 2006 after only 3 years. Total run of AJ30/35 was nearly 250,000 units

4.2 L  

The , AJ33 and AJ34 versions retain the  bore with  stroke.

Vehicles using this engine:
 2003–2006 Jaguar XK-series , 
 2006–2008 Jaguar XK-series , 
 2002–2008 Jaguar S-Type 4.2,   and 
 2004–2009 Jaguar XJ8,   and 
 2008–2010 Jaguar XF,   and

Supercharged 
The AJ33S is a supercharged/intercooled variant of the AJ33. The engine was later updated to AJ34S specification to include Variable Valve Timing as well as other minor updates.

Vehicles using this engine:
 2004-2009 Jaguar XJR/Super V8,   and 
 2003-2006 Jaguar XKR,   and 
 2006-2008 Jaguar XKR,   and 
 2003-2008 Jaguar S-Type R,   and 
 2005-2009 Daimler Super Eight
 2008-2010 Jaguar XF,   and 

Land Rover also offered a supercharged version of the 4.2 L as that company's high-performance engine. Land Rover's version is not the same as the Jaguar's version but it was adapted from it.

Applications:
 2006-2009 Land Rover Range Rover Sport  and 
 2006-2009 Land Rover Range Rover  and

4.4 L 

The  AJ41 version features an  bore and stroke. This engine replaced the BMW M62 engine used in 2003-2005 Range Rover models.

Applications:
 2005-2009 Land Rover Discovery 3 / LR3 - , 
 2006-2009 Land Rover Range Rover Sport -  at 5,500 rpm,  at 4,000 rpm
 2006-2009 Land Rover Range Rover -  at 5,750 rpm,  at 4,000 rpm

Aston Martin 4.3/4.7

Aston Martin hand-assembles a special version of the AJ-V8 for the 2005 V8 Vantage known as AJ37. This engine is unique to Aston Martin and features race-style dry-sump lubrication, which enables it to be mounted low to lower the centre of gravity. The firing order is the same as the other AJ-V8 engines although the cylinder numbering is different (AJ37 = 1-5-4-2-6-3-7-8 vs. AJ26 = 1-2-7-3-4-5-6-8). The engine is assembled by hand at the AM facility in Cologne, Germany, which also builds the V12 for the DB9 and Vanquish. The cylinder block, cylinder heads, crankshaft, connecting rods, pistons, camshafts, inlet and exhaust manifolds, lubrication system and engine management are all unique to the Aston Martin version.

In May 2008, Aston Martin released a new design that used pressed cylinder liners instead of cast-in liners. The Aston Martin V8 Vantage S features the same 4.7-litre V8 engine found in the base Vantage, but with improved intake airflow, new mufflers, and new programming that keeps the exhaust system's bypass valves open longer. This engine is also used in the bespoke Aston Martin DB10 concept car for the 2015 James Bond film Spectre.

4.3 bore and stroke 

4.7 bore and stroke 

Applications:
 2005-2017 Aston Martin V8 Vantage
 2014-2015 Aston Martin DB10 (Concept car)

AJ-V8 Gen III 5.0
An all new direct injection 5.0 L engine family was introduced in 2009 (all new engine block). Now featuring: spray-guided direct-injection, continuously variable intake and exhaust camshaft timing. The naturally aspirated engines also feature cam profile switching and variable track length inlet manifold. Supercharged engines make use of a sixth-generation TVS (Twin Vortices Series) supercharger. The 2010 model year engine conforms to EU5 and ULEV2 emissions regulations.

The engine is controlled by Denso's Generation 1.6 Engine Management System.

AJ133

Land Rover version is called 'LR-V8 Petrol engine'.

The Bowler Nemesis and David Brown Speedback Silverstone Edition also use a variant of this engine producing .

V6

AJ126
The AJ126 V6 utilizes a AJ133 V8 engine block with the rear two cylinder bores blanked, and reduced bore sizes on the remaining six cylinders. While the engine block is the same size as the V8, the cylinder heads are shortened versions of the V8 heads. It is made on the same production line as the AJ133. 

It is supercharged and liquid cooled featuring direct fuel injection, four overhead camshafts and four valves per cylinder.

The main structural components of the engine are all manufactured from aluminum alloy. The engine is built around a very stiff, lightweight, enclosed V, deep skirt cylinder block. A structural windage tray is bolted to the bottom of the cylinder block to further improve the block stiffness, minimize NVH (noise, vibration and harshness) and help reduce oil foaming. To further enhance the stiffness of the lower engine structure, a heavily ribbed sump body is installed. The sump body also helps to reduce engine noise.

The engine uses a Bosch high pressure direct injection fuel system with fuel pressure provided by two, cam driven high pressure pumps which are driven by a dedicated camshaft. The high pressure pumps supply the fuel rails which in turn supply the three injectors for that bank with fuel at a controlled pressure.

The four camshafts incorporate VCT (variable camshaft timing). VCT allows the timing of the intake and exhaust valves to be adjusted independently of each other. The VCT system is controlled by the Bosch ECM (engine control module) using information from CMP (camshaft position) sensors. The crankshaft features offset journals and a counterweight in place of the deleted pistons and rods.

The supercharger is located in the 'vee' of the engine and is driven from the crankshaft by a dedicated secondary drive belt.

The engine meets EU5 emission regulations in Europe and Rest of World (ROW) and ULEV 70 emission regulations in North American Specification (NAS) markets.

The direct fuel injection system, advanced piston and combustion chamber design and the supercharger provide improved fuel consumption and emissions.

Jaguar will be replacing the AJ-126 with an all new Ingenium turbocharged inline-6 engine.

2013–present Jaguar F-Type V6 / V6 S / 400 Sport / R-Dynamic
2013–2019 Jaguar XJ Portfolio
2013–2015 Jaguar XF Portfolio
2015–2020 Jaguar XF 35t / S
2017–2020 Jaguar XF Sportbrake S
2015–2019 Jaguar XE 35t / S
2014–2019 Range Rover (L405)
2014–2019 Range Rover Sport (L494)
2014–2016 Land Rover Discovery 4 / LR4 (L319)
2017–2020 Land Rover Discovery Si6 (L462)
2016–2020 Jaguar F-Pace 35t / S
2018–2020 Range Rover Velar P340 / P380

See also
 Jaguar AJ6 engine
 Jaguar AJ-V6 engine
 Jaguar V12 engine

References

AJ-V8
Gasoline engines by model
V8 engines